The ICL 20s Grand Championship 2007/08 was a challenge tournament in the first season of the ICL that was made primarily to introduce the all-Pakistan team the Lahore Badshahs and to have them play against the other ICL teams. The tournament commenced on 9 March 2008 and the final match was held on 6 April 2008. The league consisted of eight teams with each team playing each other once. The tournament sponsor was Edelweiss.

Tournament results

The Hyderabad Heroes won the Edelweiss 20's Challenge defeating the Lahore Badshahs 2-0 in the best of three final.

Fixtures and results

Standings

Knock-out finals

 Man of the Series: Abdul Razzaq (Heroes)

References

Indian Cricket League seasons